The DirecTV Arena was an entertainment and sports venue, located in Tortuguitas, Greater Buenos Aires, Argentina. It was owned and operated by AT&T's DirecTV & ALG Sports. It made its grand opening in October 31 2015, with a concert by Sting.

Background
The DirecTV Arena, which was built through a system of assembly, have capacity for 15,000 seats. For its size and its curved roof structure it is ideal for musical shows, but it can also host matches of tennis or basketball. The agreement signed by ALG with DirecTV is for five years, but with the intention to renew then, explained Matthias Lynch, CEO of ALG. The ground of 11 hectares on which develops the ALG center is leased to Chilean Errazuriz group, at an estimated value of US $ 1.5 per square meter. The satellite television company brings a sponsorship sum and also make cash outlays in various productions that will stage the new complex. As to the shows that are known to be held in the Arena DirecTV , they are: Sting, Luis Miguel and others.

According to promise strategic partners, the new giant will have all the amenities for both spectators and artists. It will have a floor area of 10,000 square meters, three meeting rooms and press room, nine areas of baths, 20 dining venues, a full 12 dressing rooms, five-door access, elevator, modular stage and 20 exclusive boxes, among others.

For its size, this stadium will be the third in size in Latin America, behind Movistar Arena of Santiago, Chile, and Mexico City Arena, Mexico. This type of venues have specific spaces for the development of various shows. They consist of an indoor space, high technology and capacity to accommodate large numbers of spectators. Between the best known internationally Arenas: the Madison Square Garden, in New York; The O2, in London; Bercy Arena, in Paris, and Amsterdam Arena, among others. The DirecTV Arena will work within the ALG Center, located at kilometer 35 of the Pan American Av.

Entertainment
The arena was used for more than just sporting events, with musical acts, family productions and many other events.

See also
 List of indoor arenas in Argentina

References

External links

Music venues in Argentina
Sports venues in Argentina
Indoor_arenas_in_Argentina